Cavaglio-Spoccia was a comune (municipality) in the Province of Verbano-Cusio-Ossola in the Italian region Piedmont, located about  northeast of Turin and about  northeast of Verbania, on the border with Switzerland. The municipality consisted of the villages of Cavaglio, Gurrone, Lunecco and Spoccia.

On 1 January 2019 the municipalities of Cursolo-Orasso, Cavaglio-Spoccia and Falmenta merged into the municipality of Valle Cannobina.

Cavaglio-Spoccia bordered the following municipalities: Brissago (Switzerland), Cannobio, Cursolo-Orasso, Falmenta, Gurro, Palagnedra (Switzerland).

Demographic evolution

References

Former municipalities of the Province of Verbano-Cusio-Ossola
Cities and towns in Piedmont
Frazioni of Valle Cannobina